Keilor Downs is a suburb in Melbourne, Victoria, Australia,  north-west of Melbourne's Central Business District, located within the City of Brimbank local government area. Keilor Downs recorded a population of 9,857 at the 2021 census.

History

Keilor Downs Post Office opened on 14 May 1990 as the suburb developed.

Keilor Downs is believed to have once had a large Aboriginal settlement which dissipated after European settlement. See the entry for Keilor for history pertaining to the Keilor Downs and Keilor Plains region or contact the Keilor Historical Society.

Today

The suburbs main shopping centre is Keilor Central, previously known as Centro Keilor prior to 2013. The suburb is home to the Brimbank Leisure Centre (gym, indoor/outdoor pools, etc.), Keilor Downs Police Station and a community centre. There are also several schools, child care centres, churches and parks in the area.

Sport

The local football teams are Green Gully Cavaliers who play in the Victorian Premier League, Keilor Wolves who compete in Men's Metropolitan League North-West and Keilor Park SC who play in Men's State League Div 3 North-West.

Public transport

The nearest railway station is Keilor Plains. Typically it takes around 27 minutes for a train trip to the CBD.

The bus routes through Keilor Downs are the 421 and the 419, which both depart from St Albans station and terminate at Watergardens station in Taylors Lakes.

Schools in Keilor Downs
 Mary MacKillop Primary School
 Monmia Primary School
 Keilor Downs Primary School
 Keilor Downs College

See also
 City of Keilor – Keilor Downs was previously within this former local government area.

References

External links
 Mary MacKillop Primary School website
 Monmia Primary School website
 Keilor Downs College website 
 Keilor Shopping Centre website

Suburbs of Melbourne
Suburbs of the City of Brimbank